Bartolomé Flores (1511 – November 11, 1585) is believed to have been the first German to arrive in Chile. He came with the expedition of Pedro de Valdivia at the beginning of the Spanish conquest of Chile.

Biography
Bartholomew, known in Chile as Bartolomé Flores, was born 1506 or 1511 in the Franconian town of Nuremberg. His parents were John and Agatha. His Spanish family name Flores is a translation of his unknown original name in German. Benjamín Vicuña Mackenna (1877) named him hypothetically Blumen, which is a translation of his Spanish name into German, but does not exist as a surname in German. In his Diccionario Biográfico Colonial de Chile (1906) José Toribio Medina named him Blumenthal, a modern German-Jewish name, without mentioning his source. In Nuremberg at that time there were families named Blum, Blümel or Blümlein.

Bartholomew came about 1528 to America and stayed first in La Española, Santo Domingo and Nicaragua, from where he travelled to Peru, to support Francisco Pizarro. There he got to know Pedro de Valdivia.

Bartolomé travelled together with Valdivia's expedition in the beginning of the conquest of Chile. There he participated in the defense of the settlement of Santiago, when it was attacked by local tribes led by chief Michimalonco on 11 September 1541.

In Chile he married Elvira, the only daughter of Tala Canta Ilabe, the Cacique of Talagante. The daughter of Flores and Elvira was baptized with the name of Águeda Flores and is the grandmother of Catalina de los Ríos y Lisperguer, called La Quintrala.

He died in 1585 in Talagante.

See also
German-Chilean

References

External links
Bartolomé Flores (Article in La Tercera: ICARITO)

1511 births
1585 deaths
Chilean people of German descent
German emigrants to Chile
German conquistadors